Andre Agassi was the defending champion, but lost in the final to Àlex Corretja, 2–6, 3–6.

Seeds
The top eight seeds receive a bye into the second round.

Draw

Finals

Top half

Section 1

Section 2

Bottom half

Section 3

Section 4

Notes

External links
Main Draw

Legg Mason Tennis Classic Singles